104 Aquarii (abbreviated 104 Aqr) is a star in the equatorial constellation of Aquarius. 104 Aquarii is the Flamsteed designation, although it also bears the Bayer designation A2 Aquarii. At that range, the brightness of the star in the V-band is reduced by 0.10 magnitudes as a result of extinction caused by intervening gas and dust.

This is a double star and possible binary system. The primary component has a stellar classification of G2 Ib/II, which places it on the borderline between the bright giant and lower luminosity supergiant stars. It has passed the first dredge-up and may be undergoing Cepheid-like pulsations. With more than four times the mass of the Sun, this is an evolved star that has reached its current stage after only 135 million years. It has expanded to around 51–88 times the Sun's radius and is radiating 447–fold the luminosity of the Sun. This energy is being emitted from its outer atmosphere at an effective temperature of 5,478 K, giving it the golden-hued glow of a G-type star. It is a suspected variable star.

The companion is a magnitude 7.9 star with an angular separation of 120.1 arcseconds from the primary.

References

External links
 Image 104 Aquarii

Aquarius (constellation)
Aquarii, A2
Aquarii, 104
Suspected variables
Double stars
G-type bright giants
116901
8982
222574
BD-18 6358